FC Drobeta-Turnu Severin was a Romanian professional football club from Drobeta-Turnu Severin, Mehedinți County, Romania, founded in 1958 and dissolved in 2011.

History

FC Drobeta-Turnu Severin was never able to reach the Liga I, playing all of its history in the Liga II and the Liga III.

In 1958, Drobeta Turnu Severin was founded, after it took the place of CFR Turnu Severin in the Divizia C. In 1959 the club changes its name to Metalul Turnu Severin.

In 1976, after Metalul relegated from the Divizia C to the Divizia D, at the end of the 1974–75 season, it merged with Meva and formed a new club named CSM Drobeta-Turnu Severin. In 1985 it changes its name to AS Drobeta-Turnu Severin and in 1990 to FC Drobeta-Turnu Severin.

It managed to finish above the relegation line the 2000–01 Divizia B, but because of lack of funds it was enrolled in the 2001–02 Divizia C. It had a hard time surviving even in the Divizia C and in the winter break of the season the club withdrew from the championship.

In 2007 the club Severnav Drobeta-Turnu Severin promoted to the Liga II and changed its name to FC Drobeta-Turnu Severin, thus reviving the traditional club from Drobeta-Turnu Severin.

In February 2010 FC Drobeta-Turnu Severin withdrew from the championship because its investors retreated from financing the club any longer. It lost all its remaining matches with 3–0. This was the club's second dissolution after the one in 2002.

In August 2010 it was announced that FC Drobeta-Turnu Severin was refounded once again and was enrolled in the 2010–11 Liga III.

The club finished 2nd the first half of the 2010–11 season, being in the run with CSM Slatina for the 1st spot that assures a place for the 2011–12 Liga II.

In April 2011 the club was dissolved for the third time in its history.

Honours
Liga II:
Runners-up (1): 1989–90

Liga III:
Winners (4): 1971–72, 1977–78, 1980–81, 1983–84
Runners-up (7): 1958–59, 1963–64, 1967–68, 1976–77, 1995–96, 1996–97, 1997–98

References

External links
 Drobetina Blog

Drobeta-Turnu Severin
Association football clubs established in 1958
Association football clubs disestablished in 2011
Defunct football clubs in Romania
Football clubs in Mehedinți County
Liga II clubs
Liga III clubs
1958 establishments in Romania
2011 disestablishments in Romania